Eulamprotes nigromaculella is a moth of the family Gelechiidae. It is found in Spain, France, Italy, Greece, Corsica, Sardinia, Sicily, Crete, Cyprus and Ukraine.

The wingspan is about 12 mm. The forewings are whitish irrorated (speckled) dark grey with a small blackish spot on the costa near the base, one at one-fifth, one on the fold slightly beyond this, and one beneath the costa at one-third. The stigmata form oval black spots, the plical very obliquely before the first discal. There is a dark grey spot on the costa at two-thirds and four small cloudy whitish spots on the costa beyond this. The hindwings are light bluish-grey.

References

Moths described in 1872
Eulamprotes
Moths of Europe